The Devil's Masterpiece is a 1927 American silent melodrama film directed by John P. McCarthy from a story by Mason Harbringer.

Cast 
Virginia Brown Faire
Gordon Brinkley
Fred Kohler as Reckless Jim Regan

Release 
The film was released in the United Kingdom in October 1926, and in the United States in 1927.

References

External links 

1927 films
1927 drama films
Silent American drama films
Films directed by John P. McCarthy
American silent feature films
1920s English-language films
American black-and-white films
1920s American films